Matthias Piller (1733-1788) was a Hungarian naturalist, zoologist, botanist and geologist.

He was the founding Professor of Natural history at the University of Budapest where he maintained large collections of zoological, botanical and geological specimens some of which are in the Hungarian Natural History Museum and the Geological Museum of Hungary. In 1783 with Ludwig Mitterpacher he wrote  published in Budapest.

References
Horn and Schenkling 1928-1929.Index Litteratuae Entomologicae Horn, Berlin-Dahlem.

Hungarian scientists
Hungarian entomologists
1733 births
1788 deaths